Ust-Tabaska (Tabaśqıtamaq) is a rural locality (a village) in Askinsky District, Bashkortostan, Russia. The population was 462 as of 2010. There are 8 streets.

Geography 
Ust-Tabaska is located 69 km east of Askino (the district's administrative centre) by road. Zaimka is the nearest rural locality.

References 

Rural localities in Askinsky District